Coyote Creek is a principal tributary of the San Gabriel River in northwest Orange County, southeast Los Angeles County, and southwest Riverside County, California. It drains a land area of roughly  covering eight major cities, including Brea, Buena Park, Fullerton, Hawaiian Gardens, La Habra, Lakewood, La Palma, and Long Beach. Some major tributaries of the creek in the highly urbanized watershed include Brea Creek, Fullerton Creek, and Carbon Creek. The mostly flat creek basin is separated by a series of low mountains, and is bounded by several small mountain ranges, including the Chino Hills, Puente Hills, and West Coyote Hills.

Course
The longest single tributary is Carbon Creek, which flows , followed closely by Fullerton Creek, which measures . Two major flood control reservoirs, Brea Reservoir and Fullerton Reservoir, are located in the watershed and feed into Brea Creek and Fullerton Creek, respectively. Brea Creek and Tonner Canyon form the uppermost reaches of the watershed. Coyote Creek joins the San Gabriel very near its mouth in Long Beach.

Beginning at the border of Los Angeles and Orange County, Coyote Creek rises in two forks in the northwesterly corner of the latter county. As it goes south, it turns west and gets a lot of south-flowing streams on its right bank right away. The creek is soon joined by Imperial Creek as it begins to flow southwest through a series of flood control channels, alternatively earth and concrete lined. The somewhat haphazardly constructed channel is described as being either concrete lined, "composite,"  trapezoidal, or riprap. After having crossed the Los Angeles-Orange County border three times, Coyote Creek receives its first major tributary,  Brea Creek, on the right bank.

Brea Creek begins in the far northeastern corner of the watershed, at the border of Los Angeles and San Bernardino counties. The creek flows southwest, receiving numerous mountain tributaries on either bank. As it briefly turns north, it receives Tonner Canyon (spelled also Toner) on the left bank. Tonner Canyon begins in the vicinity of Brea Canyon, and flows south-southwest until it turns northwest and joins Brea. From the confluence downstream, the combined waters are called Brea Creek. The creek then proceeds to enter increasingly urbanized landscape, then flows into Brea Reservoir, which functions mainly for flood control. The creek then turns due west and flows into Coyote Creek on the left bank.

After receiving the water of Brea Creek, Coyote Creek continues southwest, passing beneath Interstate 5, while bending south for a brief stretch before turning back north. Shortly downstream from the confluence, it is joined by its North Fork, or La Canada Verde Creek. The  North Fork begins in three forks, which merge and flow due south.  The creek is joined by a small tributary on the left bank and then receives a larger tributary, La Mirada Creek, on the left bank. The creek then continues directly south through a flood control channel before meeting Coyote Creek. Soon after the confluence, the third major tributary, Fullerton Creek, joins Coyote on the left bank.

Fullerton Creek begins several miles south of Tonner Canyon, and initially flows west-northwest. The creek then sharply bends south and flows into Fullerton Reservoir, which, like Brea, also serves a flood-control function. The creek then flows southwest and south, before flowing nearly at a right angle into another unnamed tributary. The creek sharply turns due west, and continues winding through predominantly residential suburbs, before flowing into Coyote on the left bank. The combined waters then continue southwest and soon flow beneath California State Route 91.

Several miles after State Route 91, a smaller tributary, Moody Creek, joins Coyote Creek on the left bank. Moody Creek begins parallel to SR 91, and flows only about  before it joins Coyote Creek.

The fourth major tributary,  Carbon Creek, then joins on the left bank. The creek flows west and south into several small flood-control basins, before resuming its west-southwest course and receiving several small tributaries on either bank. The creek flows into Coyote Creek very near its mouth at the San Gabriel River, on the left bank.

Streamflow

The United States Geological Survey (USGS) operated two stream gauges on Coyote Creek. From 1965 to 1978, the USGS recorded flows at Los Alamitos, California, which is at its confluence with the San Gabriel River.

For Brea Creek streamflow data see Brea Creek#Streamflow.

For Fullerton Creek, the USGS operated two stream gauges from 1936 to 1964. In that time period, no other flow passed 1,000 second-feet, although it did come close to on 2 March 1938 (the peak of the Los Angeles Flood of 1938).

From 1962 to 2008, the USGS only ran one streamflow gauge for Carbon Creek, which was below Carbon Canyon Dam.

Watershed

Geography and geology

Coyote Creek drains a roughly diamond-shaped watershed between the drainage basins of the San Gabriel and Santa Ana rivers, bounded on the north by the small mountain ranges Chino Hills, Puente Hills and West Coyote Hills. The watershed, with the exception of these hills, a small partial divide inside the watershed, and several recreational areas, such as Chino Hills State Park, is almost entirely developed, and is in sharp contrast to the San Gabriel River watershed viewed as a whole, which in total has only twenty-six percent of its area developed.

Biology

Although channelized in many areas along its course, Coyote Creek and its tributaries provide some rich habitat for riparian and other species, including salt marsh instream, as well as coastal sage scrub, live oak, grassland and sand dunes. Native wildlife is common in the areas described, especially in the far upper reaches of the watershed, which include Brea and Tonner canyons. Aside from the native wildlife, a number of invasive species, both plant and animal, also inhabit the watershed.

History
The Army Corps of Engineers expanded the channel and lined the creek with concrete beginning in the early 1960s.  A young boy drowned in 1963, while playing on a makeshift raft, on the water behind a temporary dam built for the project.

Crossings
From mouth to source:

East Willow Street/Katella Avenue
 - San Gabriel River Freeway
East Spring Street/West Cerritos Avenue
Norwalk Boulevard/Los Alamitos Boulevard
Wardlow Road 
Lincoln Avenue 
Centralia Street 
Railroad (West Santa Ana Branch, disused)
Del Amo Boulevard/La Palma Avenue
Carmenita Road/Moody Street
South Street/Orangethorpe Avenue
 - Artesia Freeway
Walker Street 
Valley View Street
Artesia Boulevard
Railroad
Firestone Boulevard (frontage road on southwest side of I-5)
 - Santa Ana Freeway
Firestone Boulevard (frontage road on northeast side of I-5)
Knott Avenue
Railroad (Union Pacific)
 - La Mirada Boulevard
Rosecrans Avenue
Hillsborough Drive
Imperial Highway
 - Beach Boulevard
Fashion Square Lane
South Idaho Street
West Lambert Road
South Monte Vista Street
South Walnut Street
Euclid Street
South Cypress Street
Railroad
South Harbor Boulevard
Two railroads

See also
Coyote Creek bicycle path
List of rivers of California
List of rivers of Orange County, California

References

External links
Coyote Creek Watershed - Pollutants map

San Gabriel River (California)
Rivers of Orange County, California
Chino Hills (California)
Puente Hills
Buena Park, California
Fullerton, California
La Habra, California
Rivers of Southern California